How Do They Do It? is a television series produced by Wag TV for Discovery Channel.  Each programme explores how 2 or 3 ordinary objects are made and used.  The show's slogan is "Behind the ordinary is the extraordinary."  The series is broadcast throughout the world on various Discovery-owned networks including:

Discovery Channel, Science Channel, DMAX and Quest in the United Kingdom;
Science Channel in the United States;
Discovery Channel in Asia, Australia, Belgium, Canada, France, Spain, Switzerland, and the Netherlands;
Discovery Channel and Discovery Science in Italy.

Series 1 and 2, which were co-produced with Rocket Surgery Productions, were narrated by Rupert Degas; series 3 and 4 were narrated by Iain Lee; and series 5 and 6 were narrated by Dominic Frisby.  In 2008, the UK's Channel 5 began airing the series, presented by Robert Llewellyn.  This version was released on DVD in the UK in May 2010.

In the United States, the series airs on the Science Channel and is narrated by Chris Broyles.

This programme is similar to the popular Canadian-produced documentary programme, How It's Made, also broadcast on Discovery Channel networks.

Episodes

Season 1 (2006) 

Episodes in the first season aired with 60-minute runtimes (including commercials).

Season 2 (2006) 

Episodes in the second season aired with 30-minute runtimes (including commercials).

Season 3 (2007)

Season 4 (2007)

Season 5 (2008)

Season 6 (2009)

Season 7 (2010)

Season 8 (2011)

Season 9 (2012)

Season 10 (2012)

Season 11 (2013)

Season 12 (2014)

Season 13 (2015)

Season 14 (2016)

Season 15 (2017)

Season 16

Special

Episodes 60 minutes long taken the best from series 3 and 4

FIVE (UK) version

Series 1

Each episode is 30 minutes long and airs on terrestrial UK channel five.  Each programme features 2 items from the original series with 1 new item filmed with presenter Robert Llewellyn.  Llewellyn also presents links in between the original items.

Series 2

Series 3

Series 4

Series 4 does not feature a specially shot item with presenter Robert Llewellyn; instead this is a reversion of the Discovery Channel series 5 with filmed links presented by Robert between the items.  This series was not made available on Five's online video site.

Series 5

Series 5 does not feature a specially shot item with presenter Robert Llewellyn; instead this is a reversion of the Discovery Channel series 6 with filmed links presented by Robert between the items.  This series was not made available on Five's online video site.

Science Channel

Season Unknown

Episodes in this group aired with 30-minute runtimes (including commercials). On hiatus as of February 2014.

References

External links

 How Do They Do It?, Discovery Channel UK
 How Do They Do It?, Discovery Channel Asia
 ¿Cómo lo hacen?, Discovery Channel en Español
 Official Youtube channel with "How Do They Do It?" videos, among others
 WAG TV

British documentary television series
2000s Canadian documentary television series
Discovery Channel (Canada) original programming
Documentary television series about industry